Flitch can refer to the following things:

 Flitch (wood), a piece of wood for resawing into smaller pieces
 Flitch (bacon), a side of unsliced bacon
 The flitch trials of Great Dunmow
 Flitch beam a beam consisting of a metal (steel) plate sandwiched between two boards.